Amber Louisa Oatley Beattie (born 22 July 1993) is a former English actress, mainly known for her roles as Lulu Baker in Jinx (2009) and as Gretel in The Boy in the Striped Pyjamas (2008).

Acting career 
Beattie got her big break in the 2008 Holocaust film The Boy in the Striped Pyjamas, where she played the character of the main protagonist's older sister, Gretel. She had previously appeared in the television film Empathy.

In 2009 she voiced Claire in the English dub of Mr. Baby and played Lulu Baker in Jinx. Other television roles include guest appearances on The Bill (2008), Doctors (2009), Casualty (2010), The Sarah Jane Adventures (2010), and The Sparticle Mystery (2011).

Personal life
Beattie attended William Tyndale Primary School, underwent secondary education at Stoke Newington School in Hackney, attended La SWAP sixth form in London, and studied Zoology at the University of Leeds. While at university she spent a year at Carleton University, in Canada, as an exchange student.

Beattie has an older sister, Daisy, and a younger brother, Ewan.

Filmography

Film

Television

References

External links

English film actresses
English television actresses
Living people
1993 births
21st-century English actresses
Alumni of the University of Leeds